Vigil (foaled 1873) was an American Champion Thoroughbred racehorse.

References
 Vigil's pedigree and partial racing stats

1873 racehorse births
Racehorses bred in Kentucky
Racehorses trained in the United States
American Champion racehorses
Thoroughbred family 5-a